DKI may refer to:
 Daerah Khusus Ibukota Jakarta ("Special Capital City District of Jakarta")
 Daniel K. Inouye Solar Telescope
 Disaster Kleenup International
 Dunk Island Airport